The Under-19s Rugby Championship is an Australian rugby union competition for men's youth teams that forms part of the pathway for selection to the . The competition is hosted annually by Rugby Australia and players must meet an under-19 age requirement. Previously, this tournament was played closer in time to the World Junior Championship and used an under-20 age requirement.

History

National U20s
The first National U20 Rugby Championship was played in 2014, and was contested by teams from New South Wales, Queensland and an Australian Barbarians side (selected from the other states and territories). National under-20 teams from the Pacific islands were also invited to play matches.

The competition was played over two stages, with a Southern States U20 Championship held in March for teams from ACT, Victoria, Western Australia, South Australia, Tasmania, Northern Territory, as well as New South Wales Country and Queensland Country. A representative team from that tournament was selected to participate in the National U20 Championship's top division.

Super U20s
The Super Under 20s Championship was launched in 2016, with teams from Australia's five Super Rugby franchises competing. Matches were scheduled as curtain-raisers to home games hosted by the Super Rugby teams, with the tournament played as a single round-robin followed by a final between the top two sides to determine the champion team.

U19s Rugby Championship
In 2018 the competition was changed to an Under-19 championship played six months earlier in the lead in to  the  campaign for the Oceania and World Rugby tournaments.

Teams
The teams playing in the Under-19s Rugby Championship are:

 Australian Barbarians U19
 Brisbane City U19 
 Brumbies U19
 Melbourne Rebels U19

 NSW Country U19
 Queensland Country U19
 Sydney U19
 Western Australia U19

Following the tournament, an initial squad for the Junior Wallabies team is selected from the best players. The Australian team competes in the Oceania U20 and World Rugby U20 championships.

Champions

See also

 Australia national under-20 rugby union team
 Oceania Under 20 Rugby Championship
 World Rugby Under 20 Championship

References

External links
 2015 National U20 Championship official ARU homepage

Rugby union leagues in Australia
2014 establishments in Australia
Sports leagues established in 2014
Youth sport in Australia